The Oath of Peter Hergatz (German: Der Schwur des Peter Hergatz) is a 1921 German silent drama film directed by Alfred Halm and starring Emil Jannings, Stella Harf, and Ernst Stahl-Nachbaur. It premiered in Leipzig on 2 June 1921.

Cast
 Emil Jannings    
 Stella Harf    
 Ernst Stahl-Nachbaur
 Mila de la Chapelle

References

Bibliography
 Grange, William. Cultural Chronicle of the Weimar Republic. Scarecrow Press, 2008.

External links

1921 films
Films of the Weimar Republic
German silent feature films
German drama films
Films directed by Alfred Halm
1921 drama films
German black-and-white films
Silent drama films
1920s German films